Gandara may refer to:

People 
Raúl Gándara-Cartagena, long-time Ponce, Puerto Rico fire chief
José N. Gándara Cartagena, the 19th-century physician from Ponce, Puerto Rico
Antonio de la Gandara, 19th century painter, pastellist and draughtsman
Mago Orona Gándara (1929-2018), Mexican-American muralist

Places 
Gandara, Samar, a Philippine municipality
Gandara, Buenos Aires, a village in Chascomús Partido, Argentina
Gandara, Sri Lanka, a village in Matara, Sri Lanka
Gándara, a river in Cantabria, Spain
Gandhara, an ancient kingdom located in what is now northern Pakistan
Residencial Gándara, a public housing development in Ponce, Puerto Rico

Others uses 
Gammon, an adversary in the Samurai Shodown series of video games

See also 
 Gandhara (disambiguation)
 Kandara
 Ganadhara, a concept in Jainism